Josephine Johanna "Josi" Meier (31 August 1926, in Dagmersellen – 4 November 2006, in Lucerne) was a Swiss politician and feminist. She was one of the first women in the Swiss parliament and had been called the "Grand Old Lady" of Swiss politics. She served as a member of the Christian Democratic People's Party of Switzerland. She was the first woman President of the Swiss Council of States.

Early life
Meier was born in 1926 in Dagmersellen in the Canton of Lucerne. Her parents were Nicholas Meier, a hotel porter, and Josi Kumschick, a waitress and housewife. During her childhood, the family moved to the city of Lucerne. She attended the University of Geneva to study law and became a registered lawyer in 1952.

Political career
From 1959 to 1971, Meier was a member of the secondary school board in Lucerne and was a strong supporter of women's suffrage. In 1971—the same year that Switzerland granted women the right to vote—Meier was voted into Lucerne's cantonal parliament and subsequently, as a member of the Christian Democratic People's Party of Switzerland, became one of the first 11 women elected to the Swiss lower house, the National Council. During her term in the National Council, she chaired the Commission for Foreign Affairs and was a delegate to the Council of Europe. She was elected to Switzerland's senate, the Council of States, in 1983, and became its first female president (speaker) in 1991. She held the post of president until 1992. Meier left the Council of States and retired from Swiss politics in 1995.

Death and legacy
Meier died in Lucerne on 4 November 2006, a decade after being diagnosed with cancer. She continued practicing law until her death. Her political achievements earned her the nicknames of the "Grand Old Lady" of Swiss politics and the "old warhorse of Lucerne". She was awarded honorary doctorates from the University of Fribourg in 1991 and the University of Lucerne in 1994. As an advocate of women's participation in politics, she once declared that "Frauen gehören ins Haus, ins Bundeshaus!".

References

Further reading 

1926 births
2006 deaths
People from Willisau District
Swiss Roman Catholics
Christian Democratic People's Party of Switzerland politicians
Members of the National Council (Switzerland)
Members of the Council of States (Switzerland)
Presidents of the Council of States (Switzerland)
Swiss feminists
Swiss suffragists
University of Geneva alumni
Swiss women lawyers
Women members of the National Council (Switzerland)
Women members of the Council of States (Switzerland)
20th-century Swiss women politicians
20th-century Swiss politicians
20th-century Swiss lawyers
21st-century Swiss lawyers
21st-century Swiss women politicians
21st-century Swiss politicians
20th-century women lawyers
21st-century women lawyers